Thrill of a Lifetime is a 1937 American comedy film directed by George Archainbaud produced by Fanchon, and written by Seena Owen, Grant Garett and Paul Gerard Smith. The film stars James V. Kern, Charles Adler, George Kelly, Billy Mann—at the time a musical-comedy act called the Yacht Club Boys—along with Judy Canova, Ben Blue and Eleanore Whitney.

Betty Grable also is featured, and Dorothy Lamour makes a cameo appearance in the film. It was released on December 3, 1937, by Paramount Pictures.

Plot

The performing act of Betty Jane and Stanley, along with her colorful sister Judy, comes to Camp Romance, an island retreat run by "Howdy" Nelson, who offers unattached men and women a place to meet. Howdy's attractive secretary Gwen wants to get better acquainted with him.

Stanley wants to find a suitable romantic partner for Judy because, unbeknownst to her sister, a theatrical agent wants to book the act, provided Judy's not a part of it. Judy takes a shine to boat captain Skipper on the way to camp, where Stanley also bribes lifeguard Don into making a play for her.

After a case of mistaken identity ends up with the theatrical agent held against his will, the act entertains and Judy steals the show. They get the job, Judy gets Skipper and her new friend Gwen finally catches the eye of Howdy.

Cast 
James V. Kern as Jimmie
Charles Adler as Charlie 
George Kelly as George 
Billy Mann as Billy 
Judy Canova as Judy Canova
Ben Blue as Skipper
Eleanore Whitney as Betty Jane
Johnny Downs as Stanley
Betty Grable as Gwen
Leif Erickson as Howard 'Howdy' Nelson
Buster Crabbe as Don
The Fanchonettes as Dancing Ensemble
Dorothy Lamour as Specialty
Zeke Canova as Zeke Canova
Anne Canova as Anne Canova
Tommy Wonder as Billy
Franklin Pangborn as Sam Williams
June Schafer as Receptionist
Howard M. Mitchell as Business Executive
Si Jenks as Messenger Boy

References

External links 
 

1937 films
Paramount Pictures films
American comedy films
1937 comedy films
Films directed by George Archainbaud
American black-and-white films
1930s English-language films
1930s American films
English-language comedy films